TRT 1 (TRT One) is the first Turkish national television channel, owned by state broadcaster TRT. It was launched on 31 January 1968 as a test broadcast and was officially launched in December 1971. It was the only channel in Turkey until 15 September 1986, when TRT launched its second channel, 2. Kanal. It is also available in Azerbaijan on terrestrial television.

On 19 May 2012, it started broadcasting on 16:9 aspect ratio and launched its own HD simulcast feed.

TRT 1 is Turkish general TV channel, available as free-to-air through Turksat satellite, Digitürk, D-Smart, Turksat Cable TV, Tivibu or in neighbored countries via foreign cable platform.

On-screen identity 

Like other TRT channels, TRT 1 broadcasts 24 hours a day. It broadcasts a short startup at 5:58 AM, where the TRT ident is shown, followed by the programme list for the day, and then the Turkish National Anthem (Independence March) is played.

In January 2008, TRT celebrated its 40th anniversary. At that time TRT was broadcasting old idents while maintaining the modern logo and news studio. Every day, newer idents could be seen. This event also happened in 1978, 1988 and 1998. In 2018, the channel celebrated its 50th anniversary.

Logos

Shows 

TRT 1 broadcasts in a large spectrum of programs ranging from news, music, entertainment, drama, sports to education and arts along with commercial breaks. The channel aired many world-known series for the first time in Turkey in the past.

See also 

 Turkish Radio and Television Corporation
 List of television stations in Turkey

References

External links 

 TRT's Official Website 
 TRT 1 Broadcasting Schedule
 Watch TRT 1 live Online
 TRT 1 at LyngSat
 

Television stations in Turkey
Turkish-language television stations
Television channels and stations established in 1968
1968 establishments in Turkey
Turkish Radio and Television Corporation